AFFS may refer to:
 Abby's Flying Fairy School
 Amiga Fast File System (FFS)
 The Association For Free Software, a free software organisation based in the UK
 Advanced Fringe Field Switching technology is BOE Hydis' signature TFT-LCD technology